Trump Buddha, or Buddha Trump (lit.: Sukhavati Buddha of Knowing Everything), is a Buddha-inspired statue of Donald Trump by Chinese artist Hong Jinshi.

References

Parodies of Donald Trump
Statues of Donald Trump
Works by Chinese people